The Amiri Diwan of Kuwait ( Al-Diwan Al-Amiri) serves as the royal court of the Emir of Kuwait.

History
Due to Kuwait's unique geographical position, it has been a major trading centre. This was especially evident during the reign of Sheikh Mubarak Al Sabah who ruled the country from 1896 to 1915. During this time, many delegations and merchants came to Kuwait to conduct business. Thus, the need for a palace that would be the reigning monarch’s headquarters and government office became acute. In 1904, a decision was taken to build a palace overlooking the sea (al seif). It therefore became known as Seif Palace. Since then, Kuwait’s rulers have developed and expanded the original palace. Sheikh Salim Al-Mubarak Al-Sabah was the first to renew the building in 1917. On its main gate, the words: “If it lasted for others it wouldn’t have passed to you” are inscribed. Sheikh Abdullah III Al-Salim Al-Sabah also carried out major alterations and additions in 1961, and by the end of the following year, it was named "Al-Diwan Al-Amiri".
During Sheikh Abdullah III Al-Salim Al-Sabah's reign, the Amiri Diwan was headed by Sheikh Khaled Al-Ahmed Al-Jaber who continued in this role until 1990. When Kuwait was liberated from the Iraqi invasion of 1990, Sheikh Nasser Mohammed Al-Ahmed Al-Sabah took over as Minister of the Amiri Diwan on September 10, 1991. His successor and the present incumbent is Sheikh Nasser Sabah Al-Ahmed Al-Jaber Al-Sabah who took up the position on February 12, 2006.

List of Ministers of the Amiri Diwan 
The Amiri Diwan has been headed by the following people since the reign of the 11th Ruler of Kuwait and 1st Emir of the State of Kuwait, Sheikh Abdullah Al-Salem Al-Sabah:

See also
 Kuwait National Cultural District
 Government of Kuwait
 House of Sabah

References

Official residences in Kuwait